The men's +105 kilograms event at the 2014 World Weightlifting Championships was held on 15–16 November 2014 in Baluan Sholak Sports Palace, Almaty, Kazakhstan.

Schedule

Medalists

Records

Results

References

Results 

2014 World Weightlifting Championships